Leslie Clarence "Bro" Dayman (28 October 1901 – 11 March 1979) was an Australian Rules footballer who played for Port Adelaide in the South Australian National Football League (SANFL) and Footscray in the Victorian Football League (VFL).

Family 
The fifth of the seven children of Arthur Ernest Dayman (1873—1944), and Edith Annie Dayman (1872—1937), née Smitham, Leslie Clarence Dayman was born at Salisbury, South Australia on 28 October 1901.

His eldest brother, Clement Gordon Lyle Dayman (1892–1967), also played with Port Adelaide.

He married Maria Jane "Ria" Diks (1909-1990) on 2 January 1932. Their son, Leslie Dayman, was the notable Australian stage, screen and TV actor, and their grandson, Chris McDermott, was the inaugural captain of Adelaide Crows  .

Football

Port Adelaide (1921 - 1931) 
Les Dayman started his career at Port Adelaide in 1921, after arriving from Salisbury. During that year he was a member of the club's premiership team. He played beside his brother Clem at the club during the 1920s and was used mostly as a ruckman or in the key forward positions. On three occasions Dayman won Port Adelaide's 'Best and Fairest' award and also topped their goal-kicking four times. He was the league's top goal-kicker in 1929 with 86 goals.

A regular South Australian interstate representative, he made a total of 19 appearances and kicked 30 goals for his state.

Footscray (1932 - 1934) 
Footscray acquired his services in 1932 and he had a solid first season, kicking a bag of five against Fitzroy in his second game and topping the club's goal-kicking with 37 majors.

Coburg (1935 - 1936) 
Following the end of his three-year VFL stint, Dayman played briefly at Coburg in the Victorian Football Association (VFA).

Port Adelaide (1937) 
He returned to Port Adelaide in 1937, making one further appearance for the seniors and going on to serve the club in an off field capacity.

Military service
He served in the Australian army during the Second World War from 8 April 1942 to 14 September 1944.

Death
He died at Alberton, South Australia on 11 March 1979.

Honours

South Australian Football Hall of Fame
In 2002 he was one of the inaugural inductees into the South Australian Football Hall of Fame.

Port Adelaide's "Greatest Team" (1870-2000)
He was selected at centre half-forward in Port Adelaide's official "Greatest Team", which took into account the period 1870 to 2000.

Notes

References
 World War Two Nominal Roll: Private Leslie Clarence Dayman (S66657), Department of Veterans' Affairs.
 World War Two Service Record: Private Leslie Clarence Dayman (S66657), National Archives of Australia.

External links

 Les Dayman, at The VFA Project.

1901 births
1979 deaths
Australian rules footballers from Adelaide
Australian Rules footballers: place kick exponents
Western Bulldogs players
Port Adelaide Football Club (SANFL) players
Port Adelaide Football Club players (all competitions)
Coburg Football Club players
South Australian Football Hall of Fame inductees
Australian Army personnel of World War II
Military personnel from South Australia